Éric Brunet (born 22 July 1964) is a French author, political commentator and radio host. In 2010, he started hosting Radio Brunet, known as Carrément Brunet until 2016, on RMC with 700,000 daily listeners as of 2018. In 2020, Brunet joined La Chaîne Info as host of Brunet Direct and Brunet & les Agitateurs.

Career
Brunet grew up in Nantes. He studied at the French Press Institute and Panthéon-Assas University. From 2012, he regularly appeared on BFM TV, most notably in shows hosted by Apolline de Malherbe; starting 2018, he was the host of Brunet Vendredi 19h on Fridays.

He has also regularly appeared as a guest on Jean-Jacques Bourdin's daily radio show on RMC, Bourdin Direct, from 2014. Brunet published several books and opinion articles, in various magazines including L'Express and Valeurs Actuelles; he is best known abroad for calling France "irreformable".

In 2020, he left BFM TV and RMC to join La Chaîne Info as a columnist and host of the two-hour 10 a.m. weekdays show Brunet Direct and Brunet & les Agitateurs on Friday evenings.

Honours
Following a proposition of Édouard Courtial, a member of the National Assembly for Oise, he was made a Knight of the Legion of Honour in 2012 by the Ministry of Culture, as part of its annual promotion.

Works

Non-fiction

Novel

References

1964 births
Living people
People from Chinon
French male novelists
21st-century French novelists
21st-century French male writers
French male non-fiction writers
French male journalists
University of Tours alumni
Paris 2 Panthéon-Assas University alumni
Chevaliers of the Légion d'honneur